Dame Alice Rosemary Murray,  (28 July 1913 – 7 October 2004) was an English chemist and educator. She was instrumental in establishing New Hall, Cambridge, now Murray Edwards College, Cambridge, and was the first woman to hold the office of Vice-Chancellor of the University of Cambridge.

Background Information
Rosemary Murray was born in Havant, Hampshire, the eldest of six children born to Admiral Arthur John Layard Murray and Ellen Maxwell Spooner, daughter of William Archibald Spooner, Warden of New College, Oxford. After attending Downe House, Newbury, she studied as an undergraduate chemist and doctoral student at Lady Margaret Hall, Oxford. She completed a B.A. in 1936, and received a D.Phil. in 1938 for her research on aspects of isomerism.

Teaching career
Rosemary Murray went on to hold teaching positions at the Royal Holloway College, the University of Sheffield and Cambridge. She served in various positions throughout her career:
 Lecturer in Chemistry, Royal Holloway College (1938–41)
 Lecturer in Chemistry, University of Sheffield (1941–42)
 Lecturer in Chemistry, Girton College, Cambridge (1946–54)
 Fellow, Cambridge University (1949)
 Tutor, Cambridge University (1951–54)
 Demonstrator in Chemistry, Cambridge University (1947–52)
 Tutor in Charge, New Hall, Cambridge (1954–64)
 President, New Hall, Cambridge (1964–81)
 Vice-Chancellor, Cambridge University (1975–77)
 President, National Association of Adult Education (1977–80)
 Governor and Chairman, Keswick College of Education (1953–83)

World War II
While at the University of Sheffield (1941–1942) Murray did research on organic chemistry as part of a team working for the Ministry of Supply. In 1942, she joined the WRNS, rising to the rank of chief officer. She worked at Chatham barracks as chief officer directing demobilisation.

A 2013 BBC report 

describes a secret major control bunker, later buried beneath the lawns of Magee College, Derry, Northern Ireland. From 1941 this bunker, part of Base One Europe, together with similar bunkers in Derby House, Liverpool, and Whitehall was used to control one million Allied personnel and fight the Nazi U-boat threat. Murray was stationed at Base One Europe as WRNS Chief Officer and responsible for the welfare of 5,600 Wrens stationed at Londonderry.

New Hall, Cambridge

In 1946, the mistress of Girton College invited Murray to apply for a job at Cambridge. There, Murray played a major role in establishing New Hall, to address the needs of women students. She served as the first president of New Hall from its founding in 1954 until 1981.

In 1975 she became Cambridge University's first female vice-chancellor for a two-year term during which time she introduced student representation on university committees, founded the Cambridge Society, and inaugurated the clinical medical school, the new music school, and West Road concert hall.

In 1980, Murray published the booklet New Hall, 1954–1972: the Making of a College.

In 2008, it was announced that New Hall would be renamed Murray Edwards College, in honour of the vision of its first President, Rosemary Murray, and the generosity of the Edwards family.

Town and gown
Murray was a magistrate in Cambridge for 30 years, from 1953 to 1983, and was the first female deputy lieutenant of Cambridgeshire in 1982. She was president of the National Association of Adult Education from 1977 to 1980. She was a member of the Committee on Higher Education in Northern Ireland chaired by  Sir John Lockwood (1963–65), which recommended
the closure of Magee College as well as the location of Northern Ireland's 2nd University being Coleraine (February, 1965) and led to the controversial creation of the New University of Ulster, from which she was later awarded a Doctor of Science (DSc) Honorary Degree (1972). She was a member of the Armed Forces Pay Review Body (1971–81). She was a director of Midland Bank Ltd (1978–84), and an independent director of The Observer (1981–93).

Achievements
Dame Rosemary Murray was the first woman to serve as the following:
 Vice-chancellor of the University of Cambridge
 Founder President of the "third foundation" for women, New Hall, Cambridge
 Director of a clearing bank, the Midland Bank
 Liveryman in the Goldsmiths' Company
 Deputy Lieutenant for Cambridgeshire

Honours and awards
She was made a Dame Commander of the Order of the British Empire (DBE) in 1977.
She received honorary degrees from universities in several countries:
 Doctor of Science (DSc), The New University of Ulster, 1972 
 Doctor of Science (DSc), University of Leeds, 1975
 Doctor of Science (DSc), University of Pennsylvania, Philadelphia, 1975
 Doctor of Civil Law (DCL), Oxford University, 1976
 Doctor of Law (DL), University of Southern California, 1976 
 Doctor of Science (DSc), Wellesley College, 1976
 Doctor of Laws (LLD), University of Sheffield, 1977
 Doctor of Science(DSc), The Royal Australian Institute of Colleges, 1981
 Doctor of Law (DL), University of Cambridge, 1988
In 2004, a new rose was named in her honour at the Chelsea Flower Show.
In 2008, New Hall, Cambridge was renamed Murray Edwards College, in her honour.
In 2008, New Hall's Transit of Venus garden was rebuilt as the Dame Rosemary Murray Garden.

Death
She died at the John Radcliffe Hospital in Oxford on 7 October 2004, aged 91. She had an operation to replace a heart valve, which was a dangerous procedure for a woman of 91 years. She was warned there was only a 50% chance of her survival but she went through with it anyway. After the operation, she appeared fine with cards and flowers surrounding her hospital bed and the vicar said, "I had one of those wonderful afternoons when a visit to a sick parishioner in hospital cheers you up so much, that you come home feeling a hundred time better than when you left." However, two days later she seemed to become distant and the day after that, she was totally unresponsive.

References

Further reading

External links

The Times (online) obituary for Dame Rosemary Murray
The Independent Online obituary for Murray

1913 births
2004 deaths
Dames Commander of the Order of the British Empire
People from Havant
People from Oxford
People educated at Downe House School
Fellows of New Hall, Cambridge
Fellows of Girton College, Cambridge
Alumni of Lady Margaret Hall, Oxford
Academics of Royal Holloway, University of London
Academics of the University of Sheffield
Deputy Lieutenants of Cambridgeshire
Presidents of New Hall, Cambridge
British women in World War II
British women chemists
Vice-Chancellors of the University of Cambridge
English chemists
20th-century British women scientists
Women heads of universities and colleges